Kanjirowa National Higher Secondary School is an independent, co-educational institution located at Koteshwor, Kathmandu, Nepal. It was founded as Kathmandu Don Bosco High School in 1998. The school provides classes from 1 to 10.

Houses
The student- population is divided into four house: MACHHAPUCHHRE, NILGIRI, ANNAPURNA and LANGTANG. Each house has a House Teacher, House Captain and House Vice-Captain.

Co-Curricular Activities
Besides the regular sports, games, martial arts, meditation, yoga, athletics and gymnastics, the following form the school's co-curricular activities :-
 Field Trip, Field Study and Report Writing.
 Camping, Hiking and Trekking.
 Leadership Development through Club Activities (Readers' Club, Eco-Club, Social Service Club, Red Cross, Sports' Club, Prefect Council) and Volunteering in Various Programs.
 Social Service Programs.
 Environmental Awareness Activities.
 Book Reviews, Educational Seminars, Interactions with the Experts of Different Walks of Life.
 Music, Singing and Dance.
 Fine Arts and Craft.
 Science and Mathematics Creativity.
 Creative Expressions.
 Stage Show (drama/dance/Exhibitions).
 Quiz, Debate, Elocution, Extemporaneous Speech, News Reading and Anchoring.

See also
 List of schools in Nepal

References
 http://www.kanjisl.edu.np

Schools in Kathmandu
Educational institutions established in 1998
1998 establishments in Nepal